Arthur Geoffrey Moreland (29 November 1914 – 1996) was an English professional footballer who made 11 appearances in the Football League playing for Birmingham and Port Vale. He played as a centre forward.

Moreland was born in Wolverhampton, Staffordshire. He made his name in non-League football as a target-man with Prestwood Amateurs and Stafford Rangers before deciding to try his luck with Swindon Town. He played just once for Swindon, scoring their goal in a 2–1 defeat to Millwall in the Third Division South Cup. He signed for First Division club Birmingham in the 1938 close season, and made his debut in the opening match of the 1938–39 season, a 2–1 home defeat to Sunderland on 27 August 1938. He kept his place for another couple of games, but played only once after that before moving on to Port Vale in November 1938, where he scored three goals in seven league appearances. He departed after war in Europe broke out, most probably in the autumn of 1939.

Career statistics
Source:

References

1914 births
1996 deaths
Footballers from Wolverhampton
English footballers
Association football forwards
Stafford Rangers F.C. players
Swindon Town F.C. players
Birmingham City F.C. players
Port Vale F.C. players
English Football League players
Date of death missing
Place of death missing